Chagrin may refer to:

Chagrin (leather), a type of rawhide consisting of rough untanned skin
Chagrin (surname), a Hebrew-language surname
Chagrin River, a tributary of Lake Erie

See also
Chagrin Falls, Ohio